Scorodite is a common hydrated iron arsenate mineral, with the chemical formula FeAsO4·2H2O. It is found in hydrothermal deposits and as a secondary mineral in gossans worldwide. Scorodite weathers to limonite.

Scorodite was discovered in the Schwarzenberg, Saxony district, Erzgebirge, Saxony, Germany. Named from the Greek Scorodion, "garlicky". When heated it smells of garlic, which gives it the name.

References

Further reading
 Palache, C., H. Berman, and C. Frondel (1951) Dana's system of mineralogy, (7th edition), v. II, pp. 763–767

External links

Webmineral data
Mineral Data Publishing

Iron(III) minerals
Arsenate minerals
Oxide minerals
Orthorhombic minerals
Minerals in space group 61